In Europa is a Dutch series of television documentary programs on Europe during the 20th century, based on the book with the same name by Dutch writer and historian Geert Mak. The program was broadcast on Nederland 2, premiering on 11 November 2007 and airing through 2009. Quite a few locations important in European history are shown throughout the series, both historical and current.

Although the series is mainly in Dutch, many of the episodes can be understood, as interviews with eyewitnesses or sons or daughters of contemporary figures tend to be in English. Episodes are available for viewing on the official website.

Production
The series had a budget of 4 million Euro, and was cofinanced by the Dutch Ministry of Interior Relations.

Episodes
 The first seven episodes are about World War I
 Episode 8: The Treaty of Versailles and the murder of Walther Rathenau
 Episode 9: Mussolini
 Episode 10: The rise of Nazism
 Episode 11: The rise of Joseph Stalin and the Ukrainian Genocide
 Episode 12: Spanish Civil War
 Episodes 13–14: Hitler and Nazi-Germany
 Episode 15: Vichy France
 Episode 16: Concentration camp Buchenwald and the company Topf und Söhne
 Episode 17: Stalingrad
 Episode 18: Poland in 1943
 Episode 19: Riots in Warsaw and Prague in 1944
 Episode 20: Germany and Russia in 1945
 Episode 21: Yugoslavia in 1945, 22 Israël and Europe in 1946
 Episode 23: Czech Republic in 1948
 Episode 24: Europe in 1950
 Episode 25: Hungary in 1956
 Episode 26: France-Algeria 1958
 Episode 27: DDR in 1961
 Episode 28: Amsterdam-Berlin-Paris 1968
 Episode 29: Portugal 1974
 Episode 30: Germany 1977

Broadcast
After two episodes the Flemish public channel (Canvas) bought the series, starting broadcasts on 8 January 2008. Swedish public channel Sveriges Television bought the series as well, starting broadcasts from January 2009. Croatian public television (HRT) also bought the series and begun broadcasting from late 2011 through 2012.

External links
 Episodes available in English
 

2007 Dutch television series debuts
2007 Dutch television series endings
2000s Dutch television series
Documentary films about World War I
Documentary films about World War II
Documentary films about historical events
Dutch documentary television series
NPO 2 original programming